Marco Meli (born 2 February 2000) is an Italian footballer who plays as a forward for  club Siena.

Club career

Fiorentina
He is a product of Fiorentina youth teams and started playing for their Under-19 squad in the 2017–18 season. He has not been called up to the senior squad in 2017–18 or 2018–19.

Loan to Gubbio
On 1 August 2019 he joined Serie C club Gubbio on loan.

He made his professional Serie C debut for Gubbio on 1 September 2019 in a game against Virtus Verona. He substituted Mattia El Hilali in the 88th minute. He made his first starting lineup appearance on 8 September 2019 against Arzignano and was substituted at half-time.

Loan to Ravenna
On 6 September 2020 he was loaned to Ravenna.

International career
He was first called up to represent Italy in 2015 for Under-15 squad friendlies.

He also appeared on the Under-18 squad.

References

External links
 

2000 births
Living people
People from Pontedera
Sportspeople from the Province of Pisa
Italian footballers
Association football forwards
Serie C players
ACF Fiorentina players
A.S. Gubbio 1910 players
Ravenna F.C. players
A.C.N. Siena 1904 players
Italy youth international footballers
Footballers from Tuscany
21st-century Italian people